Christianiidae is an extinct family of prehistoric brachiopods in the superfamily Strophomenoidea.

References

External links 

 Christianiidae at fossilworks.org

Prehistoric protostome families
Brachiopod families
Strophomenida
Ordovician first appearances
Silurian extinctions